Jacob Christian Maddox (born 3 November 1998) is an English professional footballer who plays as a midfielder for Walsall.

Club career
Maddox was born in Bristol and began his career with Bristol City, moving to Chelsea at the end of his under-14 year. He moved on loan to Cheltenham Town in July 2018. He made his professional debut on the first day of the 2018–19 season, starting the game against Crawley Town.

On 8 August 2019, Maddox joined Tranmere Rovers on a season loan deal. After two EFL Trophy appearances the loan was ended on 12 December 2019.

Maddox joined fellow Premier League side Southampton on loan on 2 February 2020. The contact included an option to buy at the end of the season. Maddox joined Southampton's  Under-23 squad.

On 12 August 2020, Maddox signed a four-year deal at Portuguese club Vitória de Guimarães, ending his seven year stay at Chelsea. He returned to England in July 2021, signing on loan for Burton Albion.

In September 2022 he signed for Walsall.

International career
He has been a youth international for England, up to under-20 level. In June 2017, he was selected to represent England at the 2017 UEFA European Under-19 Championship.

Career statistics

References

1998 births
Living people
Footballers from Bristol
Black British sportspeople
English footballers
England youth international footballers
Bristol City F.C. players
Chelsea F.C. players
Cheltenham Town F.C. players
Tranmere Rovers F.C. players
Southampton F.C. players
Vitória S.C. players
Burton Albion F.C. players
Walsall F.C. players
English Football League players
Primeira Liga players
Association football midfielders
English expatriate footballers
English expatriate sportspeople in Portugal
Expatriate footballers in Portugal